Leucadendron nobile is a species of plant in the family Proteaceae. It is endemic to South Africa.

References

nobile
Endemic flora of South Africa
Flora of the Cape Provinces
Fynbos
Least concern plants
Least concern biota of Africa
Taxonomy articles created by Polbot